Soodoma is a village in Kanepi Parish, Põlva County in southeastern Estonia. It's located about 4.5 km southeast of Kanepi, the administrative centre of the municipality, by the Tallinn–Tartu–Võru–Luhamaa road (E263), just next to Erastvere. As of 2011 Census, the village's population was 150.

The village is specially known for its odd name referring to the infamous biblical city Sodom. It gained the name from a farmstead which was named by the local landlord from the Erastvere Manor.

References

Villages in Põlva County